New Orleans Breakers  may refer to:

 New Orleans Breakers (1984)
 New Orleans Breakers (2022)